Alexis Raynaud (born 19 August 1994) is a French sport shooter. Competing in the 50 meter rifle three positions he won a silver medal at the 2015 European Championships and a bronze medal at the 2016 Olympics.

References

External links
 
 

1994 births
Living people
French male sport shooters
Olympic shooters of France
Shooters at the 2016 Summer Olympics
Olympic medalists in shooting
Olympic bronze medalists for France
Medalists at the 2016 Summer Olympics
Universiade medalists in shooting
ISSF rifle shooters
People from Grasse
Universiade silver medalists for France
Universiade bronze medalists for France
European Games competitors for France
Shooters at the 2019 European Games
Medalists at the 2015 Summer Universiade
Sportspeople from Alpes-Maritimes
21st-century French people